Crasimorpha is a genus of moth in the family Gelechiidae.

Species
 Crasimorpha infuscata Hodges, 1963
 Crasimorpha peragrata Meyrick, 1923

References

Chelariini